Stephen Okumu (28 February 1958 – 7 October 2019) was a Kenyan boxer. He competed in the men's light middleweight event at the 1984 Summer Olympics.

References

External links

1958 births
2019 deaths
Kenyan male boxers
Olympic boxers of Kenya
Boxers at the 1984 Summer Olympics
Place of birth missing
Light-middleweight boxers